Mougeotiopsis is a monotypic genus of algae belonging to the family Zygnemataceae. It only contains one known species, Mougeotiopsis calospora Palla

The genus name of Mougeotiopsis is in honour of Jean-Baptiste Mougeot (1776–1858), who was a French physician and botanist.

The genus was circumscribed by Eduard Palla in Ber. Deutsch. Bot. Ges. vol.12 n pages 228, 234-235 in 1894.

References

Zygnemataceae
Charophyta genera